Zankou Chicken is a small, family-owned chain of Armenian and Mediterranean  fast casual restaurants located in the Los Angeles neighborhood of Little Armenia.  The restaurants are especially known for their spit-roasted chicken, shawarma, falafel, tahini, and a "secret" garlic sauce.

History
The first Zankou Chicken opened in 1962 in the Bourj Hammoud neighborhood of Beirut, Lebanon, by Armenian Vartkes Iskenderian and his family.

The chain was established within the United States in 1983 by his son, Mardiros Iskenderian, after the family immigrated to Los Angeles, California. After considering opening a dry cleaning business or selling men's suits, Iskenderian recognized a lack of restaurants catering to the growing Middle Eastern immigrant population in Los Angeles. This included Armenian and Lebanese compatriots who fled Lebanon during the civil war.

The first restaurant in Los Angeles opened in an East Hollywood neighborhood called Little Armenia and is located at the corner of Sunset Boulevard and Normandie Avenue. The restaurant is especially known for its thick, paste-like garlic sauce, created by Vartkes' wife, Markrid and widely imitated.

In 1991, the family agreed to divide the business when Mardiros wanted to open additional restaurants. The new restaurants would be owned by Mardiros, while the original Sunset and Normandie store would be owned by his parents and two sisters. Vartkes Iskenderian died in 1992.

Since opening, Zankou Chicken has expanded and includes the following locations in the greater Los Angeles area: East Hollywood, West Hollywood, West Los Angeles, Burbank, Glendale, Pasadena, Toluca Lake, Van Nuys, Montebello, Anaheim, Huntington Beach, and Valencia. (The original location and Montebello locations are not listed on the website; Rita Iskenderian owns the website and doesn't include them.)

On January 14, 2003, after a heated argument, Zankou Chicken owner Mardiros Iskenderian shot and killed his sister, Dzovig Marjik, and his mother Margarit Iskenderian; he then killed himself in a double-murder suicide. Iskenderian was in the late stages of colon and brain cancer, which is believed to have had an effect on his mental faculties. The repercussions of this event, and the lasting division of the brand into two family factions, impeded the continuing growth of the business despite the restaurants' popularity.
In the California Court of Appeal case Iskenderian v. Iskenderian, Mardiros Iskenderian's widow Rita unsuccessfully sought to attain sole control of the Zankou Chicken trademark.

In 2013, Zankou Chicken was one of the contributors for Green Armenia, which brings attention to environmental problems faced by the people of Armenia.

In popular culture
 The restaurant was mentioned by Beck (rhyming "Zankou chicken" with "ripe for the pickin'") in his song "Debra", from the album Midnite Vultures.
 The music video for Childish Gambino's song "Sober" from his EP Kauai was filmed in the original Hollywood location.
 A Zankou Chicken location is mentioned as a wayfinding point as part of driving directions given in the Saturday Night Live sketch "The Californians" (in "Stuart Has Cancer")
 Zankou Chicken inspired a fictional Palestinian chicken restaurant in Curb Your Enthusiasm, so good that "it could end the rift in the Middle East".
 Marti Noxon, who co-produced Buffy the Vampire Slayer, called Zankou Chicken one of her "go-to" take out spots.
 Zankou Chicken is a subject in Rob Delaney's book Mother. Wife. Sister.
 Adam Richman of Man v. Food called Zankou Chicken a "can't miss".
 The Zankou Chicken Murders were featured in the 32nd episode of "My Favorite Murder"
 In the TV series Bosch (2016, Season 3, Episode 5, at 31 minutes), Detective Jerry Edgar offers a bag of food from Zankou Chicken to Harry Bosch, as a peace offering
 In the 2009  Film Funny People Seth Rogen can be seen wearing a Zankou Chicken shirt
 The Comedy Podcast Dungeons and Daddies made a referencial joke about a Kenku calling it a “Kankou Chicken”

See also
 History of the Armenian Americans in Los Angeles
 List of fast-food chicken restaurants
 List of Lebanese restaurants

References

External links
 Zankou Chicken Official Site – 9 Locations: Anaheim, Burbank, Glendale, Pasadena, Toluca Lake, Valencia, Van Nuys, West Hollywood, W. Los Angeles
 Zankou Chicken Official Site – 3 Locations: Hollywood, Tarzana, Granada Hills

1962 establishments in Lebanon
Armenian cuisine
Armenian-American culture in California
Companies based in Los Angeles County, California
Fast-food poultry restaurants
Family-owned companies of the United States
Lebanese restaurants
Lebanese-American culture in California
Middle Eastern cuisine
Middle Eastern-American culture in Los Angeles
Restaurants established in 1962
Restaurants in Los Angeles